Adventure Playground is an album by English saxophonist John Surman featuring Paul Bley, Gary Peacock and Tony Oxley recorded in 1991 and released by ECM.

Reception
The Allmusic review awarded the album 4 stars.

Track listing
All compositions by John Surman except where noted.
 "Only Yesterday" (Gary Peacock) – 8:40   
 "Fig Foot" (Paul Bley) – 4:30   
 "Quadraphonic Question" – 14:14   
 "Twice Said Once" (Bley) – 5:51   
 "Just for Now" (Tony Oxley) – 3:45   
 "As If We Knew" – 7:25   
 "Twisted Roots" – 10:16   
 "Duet for One" – 3:27   
 "Seven" (Carla Bley) – 5:42

Personnel
John Surman – soprano saxophone, baritone saxophone, bass clarinet
Paul Bley – piano
Gary Peacock – bass
Tony Oxley – drums

References

ECM Records albums
John Surman albums
1992 albums
Albums produced by Manfred Eicher